Hilzingen is a town in the district of Konstanz in Baden-Württemberg in Germany.

Twin towns — sister cities
Hilzingen is twinned with:

  Lizzano in Belvedere, Italy
  Stolpen, Germany

References

Konstanz (district)